Serrulina serrulata is a species of air-breathing land snail, a terrestrial pulmonate gastropod mollusk in the family Clausiliidae, the door snails, all of which have a clausilium.

Subspecies 
Subspecies within this species include:
 Serrulina serrulata serrulata (L. Pfeiffer 1847)
 Serrulina serrulata amanica (Naegele 1906)

Distribution

Serrulina serrulata amanica (Naegele 1906) 

 Southern Turkey  Amanus Mountains (Hatay Province)

Serrulina serrulata serrulata (L. Pfeiffer 1847) 
 Western, Northern, Central and Southern Caucasus to Azerbaijan
 Northern Turkey
 Bulgaria
 Romania - 4 localities
 Moldova - 1 locality in Codri
 Western Ukraine - 3 localities in Carpathians, where protected since 1994 by Red Book of Ukraine

References

Clausiliidae
Gastropods described in 1847